Chichester Theological College (1838–1994) was an Anglican theological college for the Diocese of Chichester in Sussex, England. Its churchmanship was high church and Anglo-Catholic.

History

Chichester Theological College was founded by William Otter in July 1838, the first such diocesan college in England. Charles Marriott of Oriel College, Oxford, was its first principal and the first donation, of £50, for the college was from W. E. Gladstone.

From 1886, during Josiah Sanders Teulon's time as principal, the college experienced a gradual decline in students. This was exacerbated in 1899 when he resigned but retained his income as a resident canon. At a meeting of the college council, it was resolved to close the college. However, the vice-principal made a successful case for continuing and Herbert Rickard was appointed the new principal.

In 1903, a hostel in West Street, Chichester, was bought for £1000 by the college council, the balance being paid by the principal in memory of his wife. This was refitted and became the college headquarters. This hostel was sold in 1919 and the proceeds went towards the purchase of new headquarters in Westgate, Chichester, for £3500. On 1 May 1919, the college was formally reopened by Bishop Charles Ridgeway (his last episcopal act) and was dedicated to St Richard of Chichester.

During the Second World War the college was forced to move temporarily to Cambridge while its buildings in Chichester were used by the military authorities. At the end of the war, the college buildings were sold, except for Marriott House, which was used to house the reopened college from 21 October 1946. New residential accommodation, named Gillett House, was designed by Ahrends, Burton and Koralek, now a Listed building.

Closure
After the closure of Chichester Theological College in 1994, its theological library was transferred to the University of Chichester. In addition, St Bartholomew's Chapel, which served as the chapel to the theological college, is now the chaplaincy building of Chichester College.

St Bartholomew's Church after being vacant since 2015 when the 10 year lease to Chichester College as a performance space ended, was sold to a local family partnership as an arts and community hire venue called the Chichester City Arts Centre. The centre is also the home of the Rosemary Bell Academy of Dance, a local 10 year old school for teaching classical ballet to the Royal Academy of Dance (RAD) syllabus to children of pre-school and school age as well as adult students. The centre opened in September 2022.

List of principals
 1838: Charles Marriott, supporter of the Oxford Movement
 1842: Henry Browne, English classical and biblical scholar
 1846: Philip Freeman, scholar and Archdeacon of Exeter
 1854: Charles Anthony Swainson
 1870: Arthur Rawson Ashwell, writer, preacher, teacher and canon residentiary of Chichester Cathedral
 1879: William Awdry, the first Bishop of Southampton
 1886: Josiah Sanders Teulon
 1899: Herbert Rickard until 1918
 1919: Herman Leonard Pass, reopened the college after the First World War
 1933: Charles Scott Gillett
 1946: John Moorman, Bishop of Ripon from 1956 to 1975
 1956: Cheslyn Jones
 1971: Alan Wilkinson
 1975: Robert John Halliburton
 1982: John Hind, Bishop of Chichester
 1991: Peter Atkinson, Dean of Worcester.

Notable alumni

James Ayong (1944-2018), Archbishop of Papua New Guinea 
George Austin (1931-2019), Archdeacon of York
Paul-Gordon Chandler (born 1964), Bishop of Episcopal Diocese of Wyoming and author
Barry Curtis (born 1933), Bishop of Calgary and Metropolitan of Rupert's Land 
Edwin Dodgson (1846–1918), missionary
John Ford (born 1952), Bishop of The Murray, formerly Bishop of Plymouth
Arthur John Hawes (born 1943), Archdeacon of Lincoln 
Christopher Hewetson (born 1937), Archdeacon of Chester
Roger Jupp (born 1956), Bishop of Popondetta
Morris Maddocks (1928–2008), assistant bishop in the Diocese of Chichester
David Nicholls (1936–96), theologian
Conrad Noel (1869-1942), noted Christian Socialist known as the 'Red Vicar'
Ernest Raymond (1888–1974), novelist
David Rossdale (born 1953), Bishop of Grimsby
Oswald Trellis (born 1935), Dean of St George's Cathedral, Georgetown 
Victor Whitechurch (1868-1933), writer of detective fiction
Stephen Lake (born 1963), Dean of Gloucester

References

External links
Diocese of Chichester site

Anglo-Catholic educational establishments
Anglican seminaries and theological colleges
Former theological colleges in England
Religious organizations established in 1838
Educational institutions established in 1838
1994 disestablishments